Japan Vulnerability Notes (JVN) is Japan's national vulnerability database. It is maintained by the Japan Computer Emergency Response Team Coordination Center and the Japanese government's Information-Technology Promotion Agency.

References

External links 
 https://jvn.jp/en/

Security vulnerability databases